Gekkonidae (the common geckos) is the largest family of geckos, containing over 950 described species in 64 genera. Members of the Gekkonidae comprise many of the most widespread gecko species, including house geckos (Hemidactylus), tokay geckos (Gekko), day geckos (Phelsuma), mourning geckos (Lepidodactylus) and dtellas (Gehyra). Gekkonid geckos occur globally and are particularly species-rich in tropical areas.

Hemidactylus geckos are one of the most species-rich and widely distributed of all reptile genera.

Fossils 
The earliest known gekkonidae fossil record Yantarogekko was found in Eocene-Aged Baltic amber.

Distribution 
Species within the Gekkonidae family can be located in every warm land area, furthermore, many genera are capable of widespread geographical habitation. Genus Hemidactylus alone supports this claim as it can be identified in all sub-tropical areas of the world. However, many other genera exist that are endemic, for example, genera afroedura, and afrogecko, are distributed in the continent of Africa. The range of genus Lepidodactylus stretches from South Asia to Oceania; this genus also accounts for several island species. The genera listed here do not account for all Gekkonidae subspecies and are used only as examples of distribution, for a full list see section 'Genera'.

Genera
Gekkonidae contains the following genera:
Possibly belonging to the family:

Yantarogekko (fossil)

Phylogeny
Pyron, et al. (2013) presents the following classification of Gekkonidae genera, based on molecular phylogenetics.

References

 
Lizard families
Taxa named by John Edward Gray
Geckos
Extant Eocene first appearances

bcl:Tukô